Mark Anthony Cooper (April 20, 1800 – March 17, 1885) was a United States Representative, businessman and lawyer from Georgia. His cousin was U.S. Representative Eugenius Aristides Nisbet.

Cooper was born near Powellton, Georgia, in Hancock County in 1800 and graduated from South Carolina College (now the University of South Carolina) in Columbia in 1819. After studying law and gaining admittance to the state bar in 1821, he practiced law in Eatonton, Georgia. He later moved to Columbus, Georgia. In 1825 and again in 1836, Cooper fought in the Seminole Wars, during which he served at the rank of Major.

Cooper was first married to Evaline Flournoy, sometime around 1821, but she died only 3 months into their marriage. He then remarried in 1826 to Sophronia Randle. The two had eleven children, seven who survived infancy.  

In 1833, Cooper served in the Georgia House of Representatives. In 1838, he  was elected as a Whig Representative from Georgia to the 26th United States Congress and served one term in that seat from March 4, 1839, until March 3, 1841, as he lost his bid for reelection in 1840.  He returned to the U.S. Congress in 1842 after winning election as a Democrat to fill the remainder of the term of William Crosby Dawson, who had resigned in 1841 to run for the Governor of Georgia. Cooper was reelected to that congressional seat in the general election in 1842; however, he resigned in 1843 to run an unsuccessful candidacy for Governor. Cooper's second stint in Congress lasted from January 3, 1842, to June 26, 1843.

Fort Cooper, a military fortification built during the Second Seminole War, was commanded by and named in honor of Cooper.

Iron Man of Georgia
During his time as an attorney, Cooper was a lender essentially functioning as the local bank in Eatonton. He then invested in a bank in Columbus, Georgia and after a few years, sold out for $300,000 which he used to build his Iron works nearby Etowah, Georgia. This ironworks is remembered today by many names: Cooper's Furnace, Cooper's Ironworks, and Etowah Ironworks.

After his political service, Cooper became president of the Etowah Manufacturing and Mining Company in Etowah, Georgia, in 1859.

The iron works included large facilities for making nails and another plant for making pots and pans out of iron. But the most famous plant was one for making cannon during the Civil War. These cannon were highly regarded for their higher quality (not exploding as others did).
Cooper sold his iron works to another company in 1862 for $400,000 in Confederate currency. The iron works were soon taken over by the Confederacy. Most of the town of Etowah was destroyed during Sherman's March on Atlanta; however, the iron furnaces themselves were left standing.

Cooper's investments in Confederate notes and bonds became worthless with the defeat of the Confederacy. Shortly after the war, in 1866, the Cartersville-Van Wert railroad was chartered by the Georgia State Assembly. Cooper was appointed its first president.

He died at his home, Glen Holly, near Cartersville, Georgia, on March 17, 1885, where he was buried. He was 84 years old.

References

Mark Anthony Cooper- The Iron Man of Georgia by Mark Cooper Pope III and J Donald MacKee Graphic Publishing (Atlanta, 2000) 

1800 births
1885 deaths
People from Hancock County, Georgia
Georgia (U.S. state) Whigs
Members of the Georgia House of Representatives
Georgia (U.S. state) lawyers
University of South Carolina alumni
American people of the Seminole Wars
Whig Party members of the United States House of Representatives
Democratic Party members of the United States House of Representatives from Georgia (U.S. state)
People from Bartow County, Georgia
People from Eatonton, Georgia
People from Columbus, Georgia
American slave owners
19th-century American politicians
19th-century American lawyers